Vibhuti Narain Rai (born 28 November 1950) is an ex police officer and author from India. He obtained an M.A. in English literature from Allahabad University in 1971 and joined the Indian Police Service in 1975 as a part of the Uttar Pradesh cadre. He served many sensitive districts as a superintendent of police.

Between 1992–2001, Rai was deputed to the Government of India, during which time his postings included anti-insurgency operations in the Kashmir Valley (1993–94). Rai retired as  Director General of Police in Uttar Pradesh. He has been awarded President's Police Medal for Distinguished Services and Police Medal for Meritorious Services.
He was appointed as Vice Chancellor of a central university- Mahatma Gandhi Antarrashtriya Hindi Vishwavidyalaya, Wardha for five years in 2008.

Rai has published five novels- Ghar, Shahar mein Curfew, Kissa Loktantra, Tabadala and Prem Ki Bhoot  Katha .  These novels have been translated in almost all the Indian Languages and English . His other books are Ranbhumi Mein Bhasha, Kise Chahiye Sabhya Police, Fence Ke Us Par, Andhi Surang Mein Kashmir, Pakistan Mein Bhagat Singh, Sampradayik Dange Aur Bhartiya Police, Hashimpura 22 May, Combating Communal Conflicts and also a collection of satire Ek Chhatra Neta Ka Rojnamcha .

Shahar Mein curfew
In 1988, Rai published a Hindi novel entitled Shahar Mein Curfew (Curfew in the City). Its theme was a 1980 Hindu-Muslim riot in the city of Allahabad, and Rai wrote freely about how religious prejudice in the Hindu dominated police force and provincial administration led to Muslim citizens' being viewed as enemies and thus becoming easy targets of brutality and murder. The Vishva Hindu Parishad readily took offense and denounced the novel for being anti-Hindu. It now wants a ban imposed on the novel, and when Ashok Singhal, secretary general of the V.H.P., was told of a producer wanting to turn the story into a film, he threatened to burn down theatres that dared to screen the planned film. All this ire surrounds a project that has still not begun and a work of fiction that at no point directly criticizes any Hindu organization. It is worthwhile to quote here from a recent interview given by the author: "The intolerance of dissent is increasing in our society and the Ayodhya mobilization has largely contributed to this disturbing trend. The attacks on inconvenient writers and dissenting journalists are in fact motivated by a desire to silence all criticism and all reason, thereby making the very existence of rationally-thinking people redundant to the social and political process. This is extremely distressing."

He is the President of NGO Saajhi Duniya which is involved in various activities including research work to create a better world.

Works in Hindi

Novels
 Ghar
 Shahar Mein Curfew
 Kissa Loktantra
 Tabadla
 Prem Ki Bhoot Katha
 Hashimpura 22 May

Satire
 Ek Chhatra Neta Ka Rojnamcha

Criticism
 Katha Sahitya Ke Sau Baras
 "Ranbhumi mein bhasha"

Works in English

 Combating Communal Conflict
 Communal Conflicts: Perception of Police Neutrality During Hindu-Muslim Riots in India, Renaissance Pub. House (1998)

Translations into English
 Curfew in the City, translated by C. M. Naim, New Delhi: Roli Books, 1998.
 Tabadala, translated by Zeba Alvi to Urdu in Karachi (Pakistan) 2009.

References

Indian police officers
Indian satirists
University of Allahabad alumni
Hindi-language writers
People from Azamgarh
1951 births
Living people
20th-century Indian novelists
Novelists from Uttar Pradesh
Indian political writers
21st-century Indian novelists